Saankal is a 2015 Indian Hindi-language drama and social problem film written and directed by Dedipya Joshii. The film stars Chetan Sharma, Tanima Bhattacharya, Harish Kumar, Jagat Singh, Samarth Shandilya and Milind Gunaji. It focuses on the impact of forced marriage traditions prevalent within rural Indian communities. The film was released in August 2015 and went on to win numerous awards, including Best Female Lead and Best Foreign Film at the 20th Indie Gathering Film Festival.

Synopsis
26 year-old Abeera lives in a village in the Thar Desert of India. She is forcibly married to the significantly younger 11 year-old Kesar due to the village's deeply-seated traditions and taboos, and must now grapple with the negative impact of this event.

Background 
Director Dedpiya Joshii stated that the film's depiction of forced marriage is based on real-world conditions that are still prevalent in Indian rural communities. These conditions can be traced to prior practices in villages that sought to prevent marrying outside of the community, in order to maintain genealogical purity. In the aftermath of the 1947 Partition of India, marriages between cross-border communities were disrupted, which further limited the marriageable population in these communities. This prompted village councils to force marriages between mature-age women and prepubescent boys in order to prevent population decline.

Cast
 Chetan Sharma as Kesar (Adolescent)
 Tanima Bhattacharya as Abeera 
 Harish Kumaar as Usmaniya
 Jagat Singh as Kesar (Youth)
 Samarth Shandilya as Kesar (Child)
 Milind Gunaji as Apoorva Shingh Bhati

Awards and accolades
 The Indie Gathering - August 2015, Cleveland, Ohio, USA (Awards - Best Female Lead & Best Foreign film).
 Russian International Film Festival, October 2015, Online. (Awards - Best Film & Best Actress).
 Shaan E Awadh International Film Festival, November 2015, Lucknow. (Awards - Best Film, Best Actress & Best Director).
 California Film Awards, January 2016, USA. (Awards - Gold Award-Foreign Film Competition).
 Kalyan International Film Festival, February 2016, Kalyan, India. (Awards - Best Story).
 Nasik International Film Festival, February 2016, Nasik, India. (Awards - Best Noteworthy).
 International Open Film Festival, June 2016, Dhaka, Bangladesh. (Awards - Best South Asian Film).
 Hariyana International Film Festival, September 2016, Hisar, India. (Awards - Best Actress & Best Story).
 Calcutta International Cult Film Festival, December 2016, Kolkata, India. (Awards - Best Women Film).

References

External links

2015 films
Indian drama films
Films set in Rajasthan
Films shot in Rajasthan
Films about social issues in India
Child marriage in India
Fictional child brides and grooms